2K5 may refer to:

 the year 2005
 the FAA location identifier for Telida Airport, American airport in Alaska
 the GRAU designation for the BM-25 Soviet multiple rocket launcher
 ESPN College Hoops 2K5, 2004 video game
 ESPN NBA 2K5, 2004 video game
 ESPN NFL 2K5, 2004 video game
 ESPN NHL 2K5, 2004 video game
 Major League Baseball 2K5, 2005 video game
 Shake, Rattle & Roll 2k5, 2005 film